Reptile is a fictional character in the Mortal Kombat fighting game franchise by Midway Games and NetherRealm Studios. He debuted in the original 1992 game as a hidden opponent, establishing him as the first secret character in fighting game history.

Reptile became playable in the follow-up Mortal Kombat II (1993) and has remained a mainstay of the franchise. As implied by his name, he is a Zaterran Saurian, a fictional species of reptilian humanoids. One of the last remaining members of his race, he aligns himself with the series' primary villains in the hope that his service will lead to the Zaterrans' revival.

Outside of the games, Reptile has appeared in various related media. Reception to the character has been positive, with praise for his evolution from a hidden character to one of the franchise's most recognized fighters.

Conception and history

Included in the first game late in the development process, Reptile's character concept was conceived while Boon was driving back to work from lunch. Noting the success of utilizing a palette swap method for Scorpion and Sub-Zero's character sprites, he and Tobias decided to include a "super secret hidden feature" in Mortal Kombat, choosing Reptile's green color as a contrast to Scorpion's original yellow and Sub-Zero's blue colors. Developed with the premise of being "a cooler version of Scorpion", the character's concept was completed in a single evening. Reptile's inclusion was intended as a marketing tool for the arcade game: as extreme conditions must be met to encounter Reptile, the designers hoped to rely on word of mouth to spread rumors of the character's existence. He debuted in version 3.0 of the game.

Reptile's appearance caused fans to speculate that he could be unlocked and used as a controllable character. Boon noted in a later interview that due to the popularity of the rumors surrounding the character, they decided to include Reptile in subsequent installments of the series as a playable fighter.

Design
Reptile was originally depicted as a tall, muscular, light-skinned humanoid. Due to his origin as a palette swap of Scorpion and Sub-Zero, his attire was identical to their ninja garb, consisting of pants and boots covering his lower body, along with a black sleeveless shirt and open hood. Green light armor covered his forearms and lower legs, while an open V-shaped green vest protected his torso, extending to a matching small fauld and loincloth. He wears a green facial mask as part of his ninja disguise to conceal his true reptilian nature, removing it for his acid spit attack (which was Daniel Pesina's idea inspired by an episode of The Amazing Spider-Man) or his tongue grab Fatality. Reptile stands 6 feet (183 cm) tall, and speaks in a hissing tone.

In Mortal Kombat 4, Reptile's appearance became more reptilian, with his head completely uncovered. His hands became clawed, while his feet were now three-toed talons; it is likely that the authors were inspired by the appearance of the dinosauroid conceived by the well-known Canadian paleontologist Dale Russell. By Deadly Alliance, Reptile had developed a full reptilian head and tail, with gold and black armor to cover his legs, elbows, shoulders, and belt, and his shoes go off, he was completely barefoot. Bone spurs extended from the base of his skull down his spine, ending at the tip of his tail, while a similar spur extended from his heel on each bare foot. Ed Boon described the changes to Reptile's design over the course of the two games as hinting at him "evolving into a bigger character", and foreshadowing Onaga controlling his body in Deception.

Reptile's appearance in Shaolin Monks used an amalgam of his three previous designs, intended by character designer Mark Lappin to portray a classic yet fresh feel for the character. The design incorporated the appearance of his body from Mortal Kombat 4, his clothing from the original Mortal Kombat, and the look of his bare feet, hands, and armor from Deadly Alliance. In addition, black strips of cloth wrapped around his forearms, hands, and head, leaving his eyes, mouth and bare feet exposed. The design was later reused as his primary outfit in Armageddon, with his appearance from Deadly Alliance serving as his secondary outfit.

Gameplay 
As a secret character in the first Mortal Kombat, Reptile features a hybrid of Sub-Zero's and Scorpion's attacks, such as the former's freezing projectile and the latter's harpoon. He was also considerably faster and more difficult to beat than the other opponents in the game. 

When made a playable character for later installments, he received a unique set of moves. His Forceball attack creates an energy ball from his hands, while his Acid Spit attack produces a higher, faster projectile. Reptile can slide towards the opponent, or turn invisible for a brief period of time or until hit. Later titles in the series modify these moves, such as splitting the Forceball attack into slow and fast variants, or remove moves in favor of different attacks, only to return them in the next installment.

Reptile's Fatalities in Mortal Kombat II consist of revealing his reptilian face and using a tongue grab to devour the opponent's head, or turning invisible and severing the opponent's torso. Later finishing moves expand upon the concept, ranging from regurgitating acid upon the opponent to leaping upon their body and gnawing the flesh from their skulls. In a series retrospective, the Mortal Kombat development team named Reptile's finishers as some of their favorites from the series.

Appearances

Video games

In the original Mortal Kombat, Reptile is a mysterious hidden enemy character, unplayable and with no biography. Hints regarding the conditions of how to unlock the fight against him are conveyed by Reptile randomly appearing prior to other matches, such as "Blocking will get you nowhere," "Look to La Luna," or "Perfection is the key." To fight Reptile, the player must get a Double Flawless victory in single-player mode on the Pit stage and finish the match off with a Fatality, all without blocking. There must also be a silhouette flying past the moon, which will occur every 50 matches. Once all conditions are met, Reptile will announce "You have found me, now prove yourself!" The match takes place on the spiked floor of the Pit, and defeating him with a Fatality earns the player 10,000,000 points.

In Mortal Kombat II, Reptile returned as a playable character and a member of a reptilian race named the Saurians, who were pulled into Outworld and enslaved by Shao Kahn. Promised the revival of his people in turn for his loyalty, Reptile conceals his reptilian identity and serves Kahn as Shang Tsung's bodyguard, as Tsung has been targeted for assassination by the Lin Kuei ninja Sub-Zero. Although having the same ninja uniform as Scorpion and Sub-Zero, Reptile has no involvement in the feud between their clans. 

He was chosen to assist Jade in order to kill Kitana during the events of Ultimate Mortal Kombat 3, he is defeated and exiled, but reappears in Mortal Kombat 4 as Shinnoks minion. By Mortal Kombat: Deadly Alliance, Reptile returns to Kahn's service. He overhears Shang Tsung plotting to kill Kahn, but en route to warn his master, he meets a female vampire who offers knowledge of his race. Reptile pledges his loyalties to her, though eventually realizes she is merely using him and sets out to kill her. Instead of the vampire he finds Onaga's dragon egg instead, which transforms Reptile into Onaga's avatar, leading to the events of Mortal Kombat: Deception and ending with his defeat at the game's conclusion. Separated from Onaga as a result, Reptile returns in Mortal Kombat: Armageddon. In Konquest mode in Armageddon, he appears in the Red Dragon lair commanding Daegon's dragon Caro to close the portal but refused. Taven battles Reptile in combat and emerges victorious.

Reptile also appears in Mortal Kombat: Shaolin Monks, appearing in the game's opening sequence and later as a boss. During development, producer Shaun Himmerick noted that Reptile was included in the game because the character was one of Himmerick's favorite in the series. Originally included in NBA Jam Tournament Edition alongside other Mortal Kombat characters as an unlockable player, he was eventually removed from later versions of the game at the request of the NBA.

Reptile reappears in the 2011 Mortal Kombat video game that reboots the continuity of the first three games. He represents Outworld against Earthrealm in the tenth Mortal Kombat tournament, where he is defeated by Johnny Cage. In the second tournament, the younger Sub-Zero demands to face Scorpion but is instead forced into a duel with Reptile, and emerges victorious. Reptile then appears during the invasion of Earth in the retold events of MK3, when Stryker and Kabal open fire on him as he scales a highrise building. Reptile temporarily incapacitates Kabal but Stryker then beats him in combat.

In Mortal Kombat X (2015), Reptile is now capable of speech and is identified by the name Syzoth. He plays an instrumental role in Kotal Kahn usurping Mileena for the Outworld throne after he reveals that Mileena is a genetic creation created by Shang Tsung and not Shao Kahn's biological daughter, thus making her ineligible to rule Outworld. Reptile serves as one of Kotal's enforcers along with Erron Black, Ermac, Ferra and Torr, and is next seen investigating dead bodies left by the traitorous D'Vorah after she betrays Outworld by stealing Shinnok's amulet. Reptile who uses his invisibility to fight Takeda, but is defeated while his comrades are incapacitated by the Earthrealm heroes. Kotal declares war on Earthrealm as a result, and during the ensuing invasion and battle, Reptile temporarily blinds Takeda by spitting acid in his face before he is defeated by Jacqui Briggs.

In Mortal Kombat 11 Reptile is not a playable character, though Shang Tsung is able to shapeshift into him with a selectable move. Noob Saibot, Kung Lao, Jade, and Scorpion all have MK1-derived palette swap skins of Reptile, complete with scaly skin and green eyes.

Other media

Reptile is a supporting character in Malibu Comics' Mortal Kombat comic book series, first appearing in the 1995 three-issue Goro: Prince of Pain miniseries as a member of a team led by Kitana to find the missing Goro. In the finale of the 1995 six-issue Battlewave miniseries, Reptile hypnotizes Sonya Blade into wanting to marry Shao Kahn before Kahn's plot is thwarted by the Earthrealm heroes. He features briefly in special-edition comics published by Midway Games for Mortal Kombat II and Mortal Kombat 4, based on his respective role in each title. 

A paperback novel written by C. Dean Anderson entitled Mortal Kombat: Reptile's World was published in 1996. Written for junior readers, the book describes the past of Reptile's race through the perspectives of other series characters.

Reptile appears in the 1995 film Mortal Kombat as a bipedal lizard who camouflages himself until found by Liu Kang. After being thrown into a statue, Reptile transforms into a human-looking ninja and battles Liu Kang, but is defeated and then crushed after reverting to his original form. Reptile's lizard form is computer-generated while the character's human form is portrayed by actor and martial artist Keith Cooke. Originally not included in the movie, Reptile was added in response to focus groups being unimpressed with the original fights in the film. Actor Robin Shou (Liu Kang) and director Paul Anderson noted that neither knew what Reptile's lizard form would look like until after filming, making the pre-fight sequence difficult to shoot.

An original character named Komodai features in one episode of the 1996 animated series Mortal Kombat: Defenders of the Realm, bearing a physical resemblance to Reptile and described as being a member of his race. Komodai leads an attack on Earthrealm with his minions until he is ultimately defeated and sent back to Outworld.

The 1998 television series Mortal Kombat: Conquest features Reptile in his human form, played by Jon Valera. Commander of Shao Kahn's army of Raptors, he betrays Kahn and forms an alliance with original series character Kreeya to share dominion over Kahn's domain and serve as one of her mates, but is killed by Shao Kahn's priests.

Reptile featured in director Kevin Tancharoen's 2010 short film Mortal Kombat: Rebirth, a grittier take on the series canon. He was played by actor Richard Dorton and depicted therein as a cannibalistic criminal who eats his victims' heads after killing them. Not an inhuman ninja here, he has harlequin-type ichthyosis, giving him patchy scale-like skin.

Reptile makes a brief appearance in the 2020 animated film Mortal Kombat Legends: Scorpion's Revenge, in which he is decapitated by Sonya during a fight scene.

Reptile makes an appearance in the 2021 film, although his name is changed to "Syzoth", as a minion of Shang Tsung who attacks the main characters' hideout before Kano kills him by ripping his heart out.

Merchandise and promotion
A Reptile action figure was released by Hasbro as part of a G.I. Joe line of toys, packaged with the series-themed vehicle for the toyline. The figure comes with a katana and grappling hook. Another action figure to promote Shaolin Monks was released in 2006 by Jazwares. Fully posable, it includes an alternate head, detachable tongue and a large-bladed scimitar. He was one of many MK characters depicted on 2.5" x 3.5" collectible magnets released by Ata-Boy Wholesale in 2011. Reptile also featured prominently in the introduction sequence of Mortal Kombat 4, portions of which were used in a television commercial to promote the game.

Reception
The character has been well received by critics. In 2008, GameSpot wrote that Reptile gives the series "an air of mystery" due to the circumstances behind his first appearance, while CraveOnline listed the battle against him in Mortal Kombat as the fourth-greatest event in video gaming. He was fifth in Game Revolution's list of top "old school" Mortal Kombat characters", praised for his introduction in Mortal Kombat and his changes in the sequel. Reptile was featured in a 2008 MSN article about the ten greatest Easter eggs in gaming. In 2010 UGO, included him on the list of the 25 coolest hidden characters in video gaming. In UGO Networks' 2012 list of the top Mortal Kombat characters, Reptile placed sixth, stating that he is the best hidden character in the series. In a 2020 episode of the Rotten Tomatoes podcast "Rotten Tomatoes Is Wrong" discussing the 1995 Mortal Kombat film, the panelists opined that Reptile is one of the worst characters in the series, mentioning his origin as a palette swap, and argued that the series should have kept him as a hidden character because it was the one thing that made him cool.

Reptile's absence in Mortal Kombat 11 was questioned by Dale Wilson of PlayStation LifeStyle, whom stated "With classic characters like Scorpion, Subzero, Johnny Cage, Jade, and Sonya Blade all making appearances in Mortal Kombat 11, I find it odd that Reptile was left out of the mix."

References

External links

Action film characters
Action film villains
Extraterrestrial characters in video games
Fictional martial artists in video games
Fictional Hung Ga practitioners
Fictional Pào Chuí practitioners
Fictional Shaolin kung fu practitioners
Fictional cannibals
Fictional characters from parallel universes
Fictional henchmen in video games
Fictional reptilians
Male characters in video games
Male film villains
Male video game villains
Mortal Kombat characters
Ninja characters in video games
Shapeshifter characters in video games
Video game antagonists
Video game bosses
Video game characters introduced in 1992
Video game characters who can turn invisible